The Story of a Poor Young Man (Italian:Il romanzo di un giovane povero) is a 1920 Italian silent drama film directed by Amleto Palermi and starring Luigi Serventi, Pina Menichelli and Antonio Gandusio. It was one of numerous film adaptations of Octave Feuillet's novel of the same name.

Cast
 Luigi Serventi as Massimo 
 Pina Menichelli as Margherita 
 Gemma De Sanctis     
 Antonio Gandusio  
 Giuseppe Piemontesi    
 Gustavo Salvini

References

Bibliography
 Angela Dalle Vacche. Diva: Defiance and Passion in Early Italian Cinema. University of Texas Press, 2008.

External links 
 

1920 films
1920 drama films
Italian drama films
Italian silent feature films
1920s Italian-language films
Films directed by Amleto Palermi
Films based on French novels
Italian black-and-white films
Silent drama films
1920s Italian films